Erwin Martínez (born May 21, 2003) is an American soccer player who plays as a defender for USL Championship club Real Monarchs and college soccer side Utah Valley Wolverines.

Club career 
Born in Gilbert, Arizona, Martínez began his career in the youth setup of Major League Soccer club Real Salt Lake. On February 25, 2020, it was announced that Martínez had committed to playing college soccer for the Utah Valley Wolverines. During his first season, he made six appearances for the Wolverines.

On May 21, 2021, Martínez returned to the Real Salt Lake setup and made his senior debut for the club's USL Championship affiliate Real Monarchs against Austin Bold, starting in the 1–1 draw.

International career 
Martínez has been called up to represent the United States in camps.

Career statistics

Club

References

External links 
 Profile at Utah Valley Wolverines

2003 births
Living people
Sportspeople from Arizona
American soccer players
Association football defenders
Utah Valley Wolverines men's soccer players
Real Monarchs players
USL Championship players
Soccer players from Arizona